Gay is an unincorporated community in Keweenaw County in the U.S. state of Michigan. It is 12 miles from Lake Linden on Copper Island at the western end of the Upper Peninsula. As an unincorporated community, Gay has no legally recognized boundaries or population statistics of its own.  Local government is provided by Sherman Township.

The Mohawk Mining Company built a stamp mill in Gay in 1898. The residual stamp sand dumped into Lake Superior increased the town's area greatly. Today, only the large smokestack and the ruins from the stamp mill remain.

Gay is locally celebrated for its annual 4th of July parade. The "Gay Parade" as it is referred to locally, attracts several times the town's population.

The town was named after Joseph E. Gay, one of the founders of the Mohawk and Wolverine Mining Companies. It has frequently been noted on lists of unusual place names.

Gallery

References

Unincorporated communities in Keweenaw County, Michigan
Unincorporated communities in Michigan
Michigan populated places on Lake Superior
Populated places established in 1898
1898 establishments in Michigan